Miquelets de Catalunya is a Catalan living history and historical reenactment group founded in 2005 that reenacts several Catalan Army units from the War of the Spanish Succession. In addition to military personnel, they also portray civilian roles.

History

The group was founded in December 2005. It has been involved in several reenactment events, such as the battle of Torredembarra reenactment. It has also been present in international reenactment events, like the multi-period event Military Odyssey in Maidstone, England. and in "Times and Epochs 2017" in Moscow, Russia.

Name
The term miquelets is often used to describe several irregular Catalan and Valencian mountain light troops that fought during the 17th and 18th centuries in the Iberian Peninsula.

Regiments and units

Deputation of the General Regiment of Infantry
This line infantry regiment was created in 1705 by the Deputation of the General of Catalonia, the Catalan government.

Vilar i Ferrer Regiment of Light Infantry
This regiment was created in 1710 by colonel Joan Vilar i Ferrer.

Sant Jordi Regiment of Cuirassiers

This regiment, named after Saint George (the patron saint of Catalonia), was created in July 1713 under the command of the Leautenant Colonel Josep Comes, a veteran of the Catalan Royal Guard of king Charles. This regiment participated on numerous episodes during the siege of Barcelona.

See also
Miquelets de Girona

Notes

References

Bibliography

Historical reenactment groups
Military history of Catalonia